Francis E. Limmer is a former mayor of the City of Flint, Michigan, serving 1970–1973.

Early life

Political
From 1970 to 1973, Limmer was selected by his fellow City Commissioners as Mayor. Under Limmer, the city agreed to acquire property and transfer those properties plus Wilson Park and parking lot & structures to the University of Michigan for its Flint branch campus to locate down town.

Post-political
Limmer was caught up in financial law violations for registration and anti-fraud regarding promissory notes from GT&T Limited Partnerships from 1987 to 1990. He was order on September 13, 1993 to stop violating federal securities acts.

References

Michigan Democrats
Mayors of Flint, Michigan
Year of birth missing (living people)
Living people
20th-century American politicians